Sporobolus compositus, the composite dropseed or tall dropseed, is a native North American prairie grass growing from two to four feet tall. Also called rough dropseed and meadow dropseed, it is common on the Great Plains, and found in most states in the United States.

It flowers from August to September. The name derives from the readily falling grain. Dropseed has little value as food; its palatability decreases with its age.

References

External links
 Samuel Roberts Noble Foundation: Tall dropseed images

compositus
Bunchgrasses of North America
Native grasses of the Great Plains region
Flora of the United States
Grasses of Canada